Södertälje Sportklubb, also known as Södertälje SK and often referred to as SSK, is a Swedish professional ice hockey club playing in HockeyAllsvenskan, the second highest level of pro hockey in Sweden. Södertälje were charter members of Elitserien when the league was founded in 1975 and have since played 24 seasons in the league (1975–1978, 1980–1981, 1983–1992, 1996–1998, 2001–2006, 2007–2011). Södertälje SK's fan club is known as Supporterklubben

History
Södertälje SK was founded on 22 February 1902 and originally practiced gymnastics, track and field athletics, soccer, tug of war and speed skating. In 1907, a bandy section was established and the 1910s and 1920s saw the club scoring successes in competitive cycling. In January and February 1925, the club started practicing ice hockey.

The club had played more seasons (74) in the Swedish ice hockey top division until Djurgårdens IF matched that feat in the 2014–15 SHL season. They are the team that's spent the most consecutive seasons in the top division, with 53 consecutive seasons between 1925–1978. Södertälje SK have won the Swedish ice hockey championship seven times (1925, 1931, 1941, 1944, 1953, 1956, and 1985). The team has played in the Swedish Hockey League for a combined total of 24 seasons while it was referred to by its previous name, Elitserien.

Södertälje finished the 2004–05 Elitserien season in 8th place and, in the following playoffs that season, advanced to the semifinals. This was the team's best performance in Elitserien since 1989. In the 2005–06 season, however, they were relegated to Allsvenskan (now known as HockeyAllsvenskan). In 2007 the team qualified for Elitserien again. In the 2007–08 season the team finished ninth in Elitserien and thus missed the playoffs but were automatically qualified for the following Elitserien season.

From 2009 to 2011, during Södertälje's three latest seasons in the Elitserien, the team appeared in the Kvalserien three years in a row. In the respective Elitserien seasons they finished 12th and 11th. In both 2009 and 2010 the team survived Kvalserien and thus managed to stay in Elitserien. However, in 2011, things went worse. Prior to the last round, both Södertälje and Modo had 17 points. In the final round of the 2011 Kvalserien, both teams met each other in Fjällräven Center for a game that directly decided which team would be relegated to HockeyAllsvenskan. Södertälje lost the game 0–2 and thus were relegated to HockeyAllsvenskan. After Södertälje's failure to stay in Elitserien, Södertälje's then head coach Peter Popovic was forced to leave the club. Johan Strömwall became Södertälje's new head coach.

Season-by-season
This is a partial list of the five past completed seasons.  For a more complete list, see List of Södertälje SK seasons.

Players

Current roster
Updated February 1, 2023.

Board of directors
 Chairman of the Board:  Catharina Elmsäter-Svärd
 Board Member: Patrik Walle
 Board Member:  Håkan Söderberg
 Board Member : Jan Päkkilä
 Board Member: Joakim Gustafsson
 Board Member:  Peter Onstrand
 Board Member:  Per Hallberg
 Board Member: Firial Saado

Management
 Club Director:  Mats Pernhem
 General Manager:  Mats Waltin
 Marketing Manager:  Fredrik Aminoff
 Ticket Manager:  Jenny Palm

Sports
 Head Coach:  Mats Waltin

Kit and Medical
 Kit Manager:  Anders Kellerstam
 Kitman:  Lars Bergström
 Physio:  Walter Skeppar
 Team Doctor:  Tomas Hopfgarten

Former coaches
 Head Coach: 06/07, 07/08, 08/09  Leif Strömberg
 Head Coach: 09/10, 10/11  Peter Popovic
 Assistant Coach:  Peter Larsson
 Assistant Coach:  Jörgen Bemström
 Goalkeeper Coach:  Stefan Lahde

References

External links

Södertälje SK official website

Ice hockey teams in Sweden
Sport in Södertälje
Association football clubs established in 1902
Bandy clubs established in 1907
Ice hockey clubs established in 1925
1902 establishments in Sweden
Ice hockey teams in Stockholm County
HockeyAllsvenskan teams